Luis Samuel Adlard (born 13 October 2002) is an English professional footballer who plays as a forward for Grimsby Borough.

He played professionally for Grimsby Town between 2019 and 2022, spending time on loan with non-league sides Frickley Athletic, Cleethorpes Town and Bridlington Town.

Career
Adlard joined Grimsby Town at under-9 level. On 3 September 2019, Adlard made his debut for Grimsby in a 2–1 EFL Trophy defeat against Scunthorpe United.

On 24 September 2021, Adlard signed for Frickley Athletic on a one-month loan along with fellow Grimsby player Jaz Goundry. He made his debut the following day in a 2–1 defeat against Pickering Town.

On 12 November 2021, Adlard was loaned out for a second time during the 2021–22 season by joining Cleethorpes Town for an initial one month. On 13 November 2021, Adlard scored his first goal in senior football as he came off the bench to score in a 4-0 win over Yorkshire Amateur.

On 24 December 2021, Adlard signed for Bridlington Town on a one-month loan, again linking him up with fellow Mariners player Jaz Goundry. Adlard's only goal for Bridlington came in a 2-2 draw away against Lincoln United. On 25 January 2021, Adlard had his loan extended by a further month.

Grimsby secured promotion with victory in the play-off final, though Adlard was not in the matchday squad at London Stadium.

On 11 June 2022, the club announced their retained list ahead of the 2022–23 season and confirmed that Adlard would be among those released when his contract expires on 30 June.

Adlard joined Grimsby Borough and made his debut in a pre-season game against Hedon Rangers.

Career statistics

References

External links

2002 births
Living people
English footballers
Association football forwards
Grimsby Town F.C. players
Frickley Athletic F.C. players
Cleethorpes Town F.C. players
Grimsby Borough F.C. players
English Football League players